Mohamed Lamine Diaby-Fadiga (born 19 January 2001) is a French professional footballer who plays as forward for Eerste Divisie club FC Eindhoven, on loan from Ligue 2 club Paris FC.

Club career

Nice
Diaby-Fadiga made his first team debut for Nice on 7 December 2017, in a 1–0 away loss against Vitesse in Europa League entering the field after 66 minutes to replace Alassane Pléa. In doing so, Diaby Fadiga became the first player born in the 21st century to appear for Nice. He made his league debut the following season on 11 August 2018 against Reims, replacing Bassem Srarfi in the 61st minute of a 1–0 home loss.

On 16 September 2019, Diaby-Fadiga stole a luxury watch at an estimated value of €70,000 from teammate Kasper Dolberg. He confessed to the crime seven days later, and was sacked by Nice as a result.

Paris FC
On 2 October 2019, Diaby-Fadiga signed for Ligue 2 side Paris FC. On 8 July 2022, he was loaned to FC Eindhoven in the Netherlands.

International career
Diaby-Fadiga was born in France and is of Guinean and Algerian descent. He is a youth international for France.

Career statistics

References

External links

OGC Nice profile

2001 births
People from Grasse
Sportspeople from Alpes-Maritimes
Footballers from Provence-Alpes-Côte d'Azur
French sportspeople of Algerian descent
French sportspeople of Guinean descent
Living people
French footballers
Association football forwards
France youth international footballers
ES Cannet Rocheville players
AS Cannes players
OGC Nice players
Paris FC players
FC Eindhoven players
Championnat National 2 players
Ligue 1 players
Ligue 2 players
Championnat National 3 players
French expatriate footballers
Expatriate footballers in the Netherlands
French expatriate sportspeople in the Netherlands
Black French sportspeople